Desenzano del Garda is a town and comune in the province of Brescia, in Lombardy, Italy, on the southwestern shore of Lake Garda. It borders the communes of Castiglione delle Stiviere, Lonato, Padenghe sul Garda and Sirmione.

History
Sometime in the first century, the area around lake Garda, including what is now Desenzano del Garda, became a favourite vacation spot for the Veronese élite, Verona being one of the largest Roman cities in northeastern Italy. On 24 June 1859, four divisions of Sardinian infantry fought a gruesome battle with elements of the Austrian Eighth corps, under Feldzeugmeister Ludwig von Benedek, in an engagement encompassing Madonna della Scoperta, Pozzolengo, and San Martino (as Desenzano del Garda was known). This action was part of the greater battle centered on Solferino, during the Second Italian War of Independence, and was a vital step in achieving Italian unification – unification that was gained only eleven years later. During the Third Italian War of Independence, Desenzano was bombarded by the Austrian navy.

Notable residents
The Italian poet and librettist Angelo Anelli, who collaborated with Rossini in revising L'italiana in Algeri (The Italian Girl in Algiers) from an earlier text by Luigi Mosca, and whose libretto for Ser Marcantonio by Stefano Pavesi became the basis for Donizetti’s Don Pasquale, was born in Desenzano del Garda in 1761. Olympic gold medalist, sprinter Marcell Jacobs grew up in Desenzano del Garda. Italian cyclist Sonny Colbrelli and Italian volleyball player Alessandro Michieletto were also born in the town.

Main sights

 The Cathedral of St Mary Magdalene
 The House of St Angela Merici
 The Tower of St Martin (Torre di San Martino)
 An archaeological museum (Museo Civico Archeologico)
 Several old-style villas (Villa Romana) and a castle

Tourism

The city is a holiday destination in Southern Europe.  It attracts tourists from the immediate area owing to its views of the Alps from the southern shore of Lake Garda, its three large beaches (Desenzanino Beach, Spiagga d'Oro, and Porto Rivoltella Beach), and its 27 major hotels.

Desenzano is the heart of nightlife on the southern shore of Lake Garda, with several discos and pubs. In the summer, its main squares, Piazza Malvezzi and Piazza Matteotti, are crowded with people.

At the center of the city are a series of interconnected piazze that house open-air cafés, shops, gelaterie (ice-cream parlours), and bars.

Transport

The city has a main port near the Piazza Giacomo Matteotti, from where several ferries operate. On the south-western outskirts of the city is a large railway station, the Desenzano del Garda-Sirmione railway station (Stazione Ferroviaria), which connects the city to the European railway system.  Desenzano also has its own exit from the A4 motorway, the main road between Milan and Venice.

World heritage site
It is home to one or more prehistoric pile-dwelling (or stilt house) settlements, which are part of the Prehistoric Pile dwellings around the Alps UNESCO World Heritage Site.

Municipal government
The  is chaired by the mayor, who appoints others members, called .

Since 1994 the mayor of Desenzano is directly elected by citizens, originally every four, then every five years. The current mayor is Guido Malinverno (FI), elected on 26 June 2017.

Gallery

See also 
Rocca di Manerba del Garda

References

External links

 Desenzano Tourism

Cities and towns in Lombardy
Populated places on Lake Garda